1849 in sports describes the year's events in world sport.

Boxing
Events
 7 February — following years of inactivity, American champion Tom Hyer finally returns to the ring and fights Yankee Sullivan at Stillpond Creek in Maryland.  Hyer wins in the 16th round.  The fight should have taken place at Rock Point, Maryland, on 10 January but the police forced its cancellation.
 William Thompson retains the Championships of England but there is no record of any fights involving him in 1849.

Cricket
Events
 23, 24 & 25 July — a match between Sheffield and Manchester at Hyde Park Ground, Sheffield is styled "Yorkshire v Lancashire" and is therefore both the first match to involve a Lancashire county team and the inaugural Roses Match.  Yorkshire win by 5 wickets.
England
 Most runs – George Parr 529 @ 31.11 (HS 86*)
 Most wickets – William Hillyer 141 @ 13.20 (BB 8–?)

Horse racing
England
 Grand National – Peter Simple
 1,000 Guineas Stakes – The Flea 
 2,000 Guineas Stakes – Nunnykirk
 The Derby – The Flying Dutchman
 The Oaks – Lady Evelyn 
 St. Leger Stakes – The Flying Dutchman

Rowing
The Boat Race
 29 April — the Oxford and Cambridge Boat Race, last contested in 1846, is revived and this 9th race is won by Cambridge
 15 December — Oxford is awarded the 10th Oxford and Cambridge Boat Race following the disqualification of Cambridge.  This is the first and last time that the race is contested twice in the same year.

References

 
Sports by year